Elvington may refer to the following places in England:

Elvington, Kent
Elvington, North Yorkshire
RAF Elvington, a deactivated RAF station